Garrett Ray Broshuis (born December 18, 1981) is a former professional baseball player in the San Francisco Giants organization.  He was drafted in the 5th round of the 2004 Major League Baseball Draft after an All-American career at the University of Missouri.  He was also a first team Academic All-American and is a member of Phi Beta Kappa honor's society.  He has written extensively about life in minor league baseball initially for the Sporting News and currently for Baseball America.

Early life 
Born in the small town of Advance, Missouri, Broshuis attended high school at Advance High School, where he graduated valedictorian with a perfect 4.0 GPA.  Named All-State in both basketball and baseball, he also was selected as one of Missouri's Top 100 High School Scholars.

Attending the University of Missouri on both academic and an athletic scholarships, he graduated with a bachelor's degree in Psychology with minors in Political Science and Spanish in 2004.  His 3.92 GPA solidified his first team Academic All-American status, while also leading to his selection as Missouri's nominee for the Big 12 Conference's 2004 Student-Athlete of the Year.

Baseball career 
Broshuis finished his career with the Missouri Tigers baseball team in 2004, after a perfect 11–0 season.  While there he played with future Major League Baseball stars such as Ian Kinsler and Max Scherzer.  He helped lead the Tigers to two NCAA Regional appearances.

The San Francisco Giants selected Broshuis in the fifth round of the 2004 MLB Draft. Upon being drafted by the Giants, Broshuis was assigned to the short-season Salem-Keizer Volcanoes of the Northwest League before moving on to the San Jose Giants of the California League.  In 2005, Broshuis went back to San Jose where he finished second in the league in wins and in the top 10 in ERA.  This led to a late-season promotion to the Fresno Grizzlies of the Pacific Coast League, a Triple-A league.

In 2006, Broshuis was sent to the Connecticut Defenders of the Eastern League, where he played for the next three years, leading the league in losses during the 2007 campaign before finishing second in the league in wins during the 2008 season.

Writing career 
In 2006, Broshuis began writing a blog for The Sporting News.  He did this for three years, writing over 100 articles in a Life in the Minors column.  He also wrote pieces for The New London Day newspaper.  Broshuis currently writes for Baseball America, and has also written for St. Louis Sports Magazine. He also actively maintains a blog called Life in the Minors at http://minorleaguelife.blogspot.com/.

Law career 

Broshuis enrolled in the Saint Louis University School of Law. For the 2011–2012 school year, Broshuis was a staff member for Volume 56 of the Saint Louis University Law Journal. Broshuis was recently selected to be the Editor-in-Chief for Volume 57 of the Journal.

Broshuis is one of the lawyers representing former minor league players Aaron Senne, Michael Liberto, and Oliver Odle, in their lawsuit against Major League Baseball for violating wage and overtime laws.

References

External links 

Garrett Broshuis Baseball America Diary
Garrett Broshuis Sporting News blog archive

1981 births
Living people
Baseball players from Missouri
American bloggers
American sportswriters
People from Stoddard County, Missouri
Sportspeople from Missouri
Missouri Tigers baseball players
Salem-Keizer Volcanoes players
San Jose Giants players
Fresno Grizzlies players
Connecticut Defenders players
Baseball pitchers
Saint Louis University School of Law alumni
Missouri lawyers
21st-century American non-fiction writers